Teuthology (from Greek , "cuttlefish, squid", and , -logia) is the study of cephalopods such as octopus, squid, and cuttlefish.  

It is a branch of malacology, the study of molluscs, in marine zoology. 

Someone who studies teuthology is known as a teuthologist.

See also

References

 
Malacology
Marine biology
Subfields of zoology